The Soong Ching Ling Memorial Residence, located at 1843 Middle Huaihai Road, Xuhui District, is the former residence of Soong Ching-ling (wife of Sun Yat-sen and later Vice-President and Honorary President of the People's Republic of China) in Shanghai, China, from 1948 to 1963. It is in the west part of the former Shanghai French Concession area and was built in the 1920s by an American shipping captain, Leo R. Ball.

History
After the end of the Sino-Japanese War in 1945, Soong Ching-ling donated her residence, located at 29 rue Molière (present-day Xiangshan Road), to the government of the Republic of China as a memorial to her deceased husband, President Sun Yat-sen. In return, the government conferred this house on her. In spring 1949, Soong moved from 45 Jingjiang Road to this residence, where she soon witnessed the capture of Shanghai by the Chinese Communist Party.

After the establishment of the People's Republic of China in 1949, Soong served in several prominent positions in the central government, including Vice-President of China, that her residence in Shanghai became an important working space. In the house, Song met not only senior CPC leaders, including Mao Zedong, Zhou Enlai, Liu Shaoqi, Chen Yi and Deng Yingchao, but also foreign statesmen, such as Sukarno, Kim Il Sung, Kliment Voroshilov, U Nu, Sarvepalli Radhakrishnan and Sirimavo Bandaranaike.

From April 1963, due to her work, Soong spent most of her time in Beijing, and only returned to Shanghai for occasional stays and holidays. On December 311978, Song returned to Shanghai for the Spring Festival and stayed there until the end of February 1979. This was her last stay in Shanghai.

Soong died in Beijing on May29, 1981. Her house in Shanghai was refurbished and opened to a limited circle in October. On October22 of that year, the memorial residence was accredited with being a Shanghai Municipal Preserved Cultural Relic by the city government. It was opened to the public in May 1988, and became one of patriotic education sites in Shanghai. On June 25, 2001, Song's memorial residence became a National Key Preserved Cultural Relic honored by the State Council.

Collection
The residence hosts a collection of over 15,000 of Song' items. Among them, there are pictures, letters, Song's college diploma, collected books, daily utensils, presents from state activities, and also some articles belonging to her relatives. In addition, there are the seals of Sun Yat-sen, preserved by Song after many troubles.

See also
 Former Residence of Soong Ching-ling (Beijing)
 Former Residence of Sun Yat-sen, Shanghai
 List of Major National Historical and Cultural Sites in Shanghai

References

External links
 Soong Ching Ling Memorial Residence in Shanghai website  
 Song Ching Ling Memorial Residence in Shanghai, YouTube

Soong Ching-ling
Museums established in 1988
1981 establishments in China
Museums in Shanghai
Houses in Shanghai
Biographical museums in China
Women's museums in China
History museums in China
Historic house museums in China
Major National Historical and Cultural Sites in Shanghai